The 1901 Preakness Stakes was the 26th running of the $2,500 Preakness Stakes, a Thoroughbred horse race for three-year-olds run on May 28, 1901 at the Gravesend Race Track on Coney Island, New York. The one mile, 70 yard race was won by The Parader over runner-up Sadie S. The race was run on a track rated heavy in a final time of 1:47 1/5.

The 1901 Kentucky Derby was run on April 29 and the 1901 Belmont Stakes on May 23. The Parader did not run in the Derby but finished second in the Belmont to future U.S. Racing Hall of Fame inductee Commando. 

For jockey Frank Landry it would be his first and only Preakness win. For future Hall of Fame trainer T. J. Healey, it would mark the first of five Preakness wins.

The 1919 Preakness Stakes would mark the first time the race would be recognized as the second leg of a U.S. Triple Crown series. 

 Winning Breeder: Belle Meade Stud (TN)

References

External links 
 

1901
Gravesend Race Track
1901 in horse racing
1901 in American sports
Horse races in New York City